The 2009 WGC-CA Championship was a golf tournament that was contested from March 12–15 at Doral Golf Resort & Spa in Doral, Florida. It was the tenth WGC-CA Championship tournament, and the second of four World Golf Championships events staged in 2009.

Phil Mickelson won the tournament to capture his first World Golf Championships title.

Field
1. Top 50 players from the Official World Golf Rankings two weeks prior to event
Robert Allenby (2,3), Stephen Ames (2), Stuart Appleby (3), Aaron Baddeley (2), Paul Casey (2,7), K. J. Choi (2,3), Stewart Cink (2,3), Tim Clark (2,3), Ben Curtis (2,3), Luke Donald (2), Ernie Els (2,3), Ross Fisher (2,6,7), Jim Furyk (2,3), Sergio García (2,3,6,7), Retief Goosen (2,6), Pádraig Harrington (2,6), Trevor Immelman (2,3), Miguel Ángel Jiménez (2,6), Dustin Johnson (2,4,5), Zach Johnson (2,4,5), Robert Karlsson (2,6), Shingo Katayama (2,9), Martin Kaymer (2,6), Anthony Kim (2,3), Justin Leonard (2,3), Hunter Mahan (2,3), Graeme McDowell (2,6), Rory McIlroy (2,7), Phil Mickelson (2,3,4,5), Geoff Ogilvy (2,4,5,7,10), Sean O'Hair (2), Louis Oosthuizen (2,7), Kenny Perry (2,3,4,5), Ian Poulter (2,6), Álvaro Quirós (2,7), Andrés Romero (2,3), Justin Rose (2), Rory Sabbatini (2), Adam Scott (2), Jeev Milkha Singh (2,6,8), Vijay Singh (2,3), Henrik Stenson (2,6,7), Richard Sterne (2,7,11), Steve Stricker (2,3,4,5), Camilo Villegas (2,3), Boo Weekley, Mike Weir (2,3,4), Lee Westwood (2,6), Oliver Wilson (2,6,7), Tiger Woods (2)

2. Top 50 players from the Official World Golf Rankings one week prior to event
Peter Hanson (6), Davis Love III

3. Top 30 from the final 2008 PGA Tour FedEx Cup points list
Briny Baird, Chad Campbell, Ken Duke, Dudley Hart, Ryuji Imada, Billy Mayfair, Carl Pettersson, Kevin Sutherland, D. J. Trahan, Bubba Watson

4. Top 10 from the PGA Tour FedEx Cup points list two weeks prior to event
Charley Hoffman, Pat Perez (5), Nick Watney (5)

5. Top 10 from the PGA Tour FedEx Cup points list one week prior to event
John Rollins, Yang Yong-eun

6. Top 20 from the final 2008 European Tour Order of Merit
Darren Clarke, Richard Finch, Søren Hansen, James Kingston, Søren Kjeldsen, Pablo Larrazábal

7. Top 10 from the European Tour Race to Dubai two weeks prior to event

8. Top 3 from the final 2008 Asian Tour Order of Merit
Mark Brown (10), Lin Wen-tang

9. Top 3 from the final 2008 Japan Golf Tour Order of Merit
Prayad Marksaeng, Azuma Yano

10. Top 3 from the final 2008 PGA Tour of Australasia Order of Merit
Rod Pampling

11. Top 3 from the final 2008 Sunshine Tour Order of Merit
Thomas Aiken, Garth Mulroy

Past champions in the field

Round summaries

First round

Second round

Third round

Final round

Scorecard
Final round

Cumulative tournament scores, relative to par

Source:

References

External links
Full results

WGC Championship
Golf in Florida
WGC-CA Championship
WGC-CA Championship
WGC-CA Championship